Hanno the Navigator (sometimes "Hannon"; ,) was a Carthaginian explorer of the fifth century BC, best known for his naval exploration of the western coast of Africa. The only source of his voyage is a periplus translated into Greek. He has sometimes been identified as a king.

Historians have attempted to identify places on Hanno's route based on the periplus. According to some modern analyses of his route, Hanno's expedition could have reached as far south as Gabon; however, according to others, it could not have taken him further than southern Morocco.

Biography 

The name Hanno was given to many other Carthaginians. Ancient authors who discussed Hanno the Navigator did not provide direct information to identify him exactly. Some called him king, and others used the Latin words dux (leader or general) or imperator (commander or emperor). The Greek translation of Hanno's periplus account names him a basileus, a term which may be interpreted as "king", but was commonly used for high-level Carthaginian officials.

The consensus of scholarship places Hanno in the 5th century BC and identifies him as a member of the aristocratic Magonid family. R.C.C. Law identifies Hanno as the son of Hamilcar I.

Periplus account 

Hanno's account, the periplus ( circumnavigation), remains extant in Greek-language manuscripts. The original version, written in the Punic language, has been lost. The Greek translation is abridged and 101 lines long. While it contains contradictions and obvious errors, it is likely derived from an original Carthaginian text. The periplus has survived as "the nearest we have to a specimen of Carthaginian 'literature' " and one of the few extant accounts of ancient exploration penned by the explorer himself.

In the fifth century, the text was translated into Greek. Over the centuries, the translation was copied several times by Greek and Greek-speaking Roman clerks. Two copies remain extant, dating to the 9th and 14th centuries.

Summary

This summary is based on a translation by Al. N. Oikonomides. The proper names are unchanged from the translation. It reflects the views of the translator and may ignore more widely accepted theories among scholars.

As the work begins, "this is the report of the periplus of Hanno, king of the Carthaginians, into the Libyan areas of the earth beyond the Pillars of Hercules which he dedicated in the sanctuary of Kronos." With 60 ships and 30,000 people, Hanno intends to found cities along the African coast. He first founds one city, then sails some distance and founds five others. Arriving at a river, the Carthaginians meet the Lixitae, a friendly nomadic tribe. They learn of the nearby Ethiopians, and taking aboard several Lixitae, set sail again. At the small island Kerne, another settlement is built. Around the lake Chretes and an unnamed river, there are savage men and large wild beasts respectively. After returning to Kerne, they sail further south down Africa, finding Ethiopians whose language even the Lixitae interpreters do not understand. Passing further, Hanno finds an "immense opening of the sea", from which fires may be sighted. At a bay called the "Horn of the West", they land on an island where humans live. The Carthaginians hurry away in fear and reach lands where there are many flames. A very tall mountain is there. Finally arriving at a bay, the "Horn of the South", there is an island with hostile, hirsute men named "Gorillas" (see ). Three of them are killed, their skins brought home to Carthage. Having run out of provisions, they do not sail further. The periplus abruptly ends here without discussing the return journey.

Textual criticism
Both ancient and modern authors have criticized the work. Most attempts to locate the places described in the periplus based on the reported sailing distances and directions have failed. To make the text more accurate, scholars have tried textual criticism. Ultimately, the Carthaginians probably edited the real account to protect their trade: other countries would not be able to identify the places described, while Carthaginians could still boast about their accomplishments. 

Oikonomides theorizes that the hypothetical Punic manuscript that was translated into Greek was incomplete itself: it left out the later parts of the original periplus. The ending of the narrative is abrupt, and it would also have been logically impossible for the expedition to end as described. Therefore, he argues, the final two lines must have been inserted to compensate for an incomplete manuscript.

Expedition 
Carthage dispatched Hanno at the head of a fleet of 60 ships to explore and colonize the northwestern coast of Africa. He sailed through the straits of Gibraltar, founded or repopulated seven colonies along the African coast of what is now Morocco, and explored significantly farther along the Atlantic coast of the continent.  Hanno encountered various indigenous peoples on his journey and met with a variety of welcomes.

The gold trade was a foundation of the Carthaginian empire since the fifth century BC. It may have been the original motivation for Carthaginian exploration of sub-Saharan Africa. The purpose of Hanno's voyage was to secure the gold route to west Africa.

A number of modern scholars have commented upon Hanno's voyage. In many cases, the analysis has been to refine information and interpretation of the original account. William Smith points out that the complement of personnel totalled 30,000, and that the core mission included the intent to found Carthaginian (or in the older parlance 'Libyophoenician') towns. Some scholars have questioned whether this many people accompanied Hanno on his expedition, and suggest 5,000 is a more accurate number. R. C. C. Law notes that "It is a measure of the obscurity of the problem that while some commentators have argued that Hanno reached the Gabon area, others have taken him no further than southern Morocco."

Harden reports a consensus that the expedition reached at least as far as Senegal. Due to the vagueness of the periplus, estimates for the voyage's distance range from under  to at least . Some agree he could have reached Gambia. However, Harden mentions disagreement as to the farthest limit of Hanno's explorations: Sierra Leone, Cameroon, or Gabon. He notes the description of Mount Cameroon, a  volcano, more closely matches Hanno's description than Guinea's  Mount Kakulima. Warmington prefers Mount Kakulima, considering Mount Cameroon too distant.

The historian Raymond Mauny, in his 1955 article "La navigation sur les côtes du Sahara pendant l'antiquité", argued that the ancient navigators (Hannon, Euthymène, Scylax, etc.) could not have sailed south in the Atlantic farther than Cape Bojador. He pointed out that ancient geographers knew of the Canary Islands but nothing further south. Ships with square sails, without stern rudder, might navigate south, but the winds and currents throughout the year would prevent the return trip from Senegal to Morocco. Oared ships might be able to achieve the return northward, but only with very great difficulties. Mauny assumed that Hanno did not get farther than the Drâa. He attributed artifacts found on Mogador Island to the expedition described in the Periplus of Pseudo-Scylax and notes that no evidence of Mediterranean trade further south had yet been found.  The author ends by suggesting archaeological investigation of the islands along the coast, such as Cape Verde, or the île de Herné (Dragon Island near Dakhla, Western Sahara) where ancient adventurers may have been stranded and settled.

Gorillai 

The end of the periplus describes an island populated with hairy and savage people. Attempts to capture the men failed. Three of the women were taken, but were so ferocious that they were killed, their skins brought home to Carthage. The skins were kept in the Temple of Juno (Tanit or Astarte) on Hanno's return and, according to Pliny the Elder, survived until the Roman destruction of Carthage in 146 BC, some 350 years after Hanno's expedition.

Hanno's interpreters of an African tribe (Lixites or Nasamonians) called the people Gorillai (in Greek). In 1847, the gorilla, an ape species, was scientifically described and named after the Gorillai. The authors did not affirmatively identify Hanno's Gorillai as the gorilla.

Ancient authors' accounts 
The text was known to the Roman Pliny the Elder (c. 23–79) and the Greek Arrian of Nicomedia (c. 86–160).

Pliny the Elder 

Pliny may have recorded the time vaguely because he was ignorant of the actual date. His claim that Hanno completely circumnavigated Africa, reaching Arabia, is considered unrealistic by contemporary scholarship.

Arrian 
Arrian mentions Hanno's voyage at the end of his Anabasis of Alexander VIII (Indica):

Herodotus 
Greek historian Herodotus, writing around 430 BC, described Carthaginian trade on the Moroccan coast (Histories 4.196), though it is doubtful whether he was aware of Hanno's voyage itself.

Legacy

Modern
The lunar crater Hanno is named after him.

Historiography 

In the 16th century, the voyage of Hanno saw increased scholarly interest from Europeans in an age when European exploration and navigation were flourishing. Already then, the extent of Hanno's voyage was debated.

Notes

Citations

Bibliography

Ancient

Further reading

External links 

 
"Hanno's Periplus on the Web"—a 2003 directory of links about Hanno
"The Voyage of Hanno"—an article by classical scholar Livio Catullo Stecchini that analyzes parts of Hanno's periplus

Explorers of Africa
Carthaginians
5th-century BC writers
Navigators
Year of death unknown
Ancient explorers
Punic-language writers
Peripluses in Greek
5th-century BC Punic people